The fire-crested alethe (Alethe castanea) is a species of bird in the Old World flycatcher family Muscicapidae. It is found in central Africa, from Nigeria to Uganda. Its natural habitat is subtropical or tropical moist lowland forests.

It has been recently split from the white-tailed alethe (A. diademata).

References

fire-crested alethe
Birds of the Gulf of Guinea
Birds of Central Africa
fire-crested alethe